Olivia Vieweg (born October 3, 1987 in Jena) is a German cartoonist and author, as well as an editor of comic anthologies. She created the comic novels Huck Finn and Antoinette returns.

Biography 
Vieweg spent her first ten years in a Plattenbau on Bundesautobahn 4. Her first point of contact with the medium of comics is uncertain, but she herself states it may have been the German Donald Duck „Lustiges Taschenbuch“ series. More influential for her was Sailor Moon. Her first shorter comic books were written in the manga- influenced so-called "Germangaka" style. As a student in Jena she was already designing posters for the Jenaer Philharmonie. One of her trademark themes, drawing cats, developed during her time studying Visual Communication at the Bauhaus University, Weimar, and these were published in a series of cartoons by Carlsen Verlag. In 2010 she had her first exhibition, together with Katja Klengel, in the City Museum Gera. In 2011 she graduated from the Bauhaus University with the zombie comic Endzeit, subsequently made into a film which has toured arthouse cinemas worldwide.

Vieweg lives in Weimar. She has worked as an illustrator of the children's book series Vampirinternat Schloss Schauerfels and colorist of the comic series Zilverpijl. She also works in advertising. In December 2012, she gave birth to a son. In July 2014, she took over the alternating role of comic strip author in the Sunday Supplement of Der Tagesspiegel. She has a penchant for Persian cats.

Awards
Tankred Dorst Preis 2015 for the screenplay for "ENDZEIT"
Comic grant from the Ehapa Comic Collection of the Egmont Ehapa Publishing House 2012
ICOM Independent Comic Award 2010

Bibliography
Comics

Spanische Ausgabe: 

Cartoons

Anthology contributions

As editor
 (mit Vicky Danko und Beatrice Beckmann): Paper Theatre Band 6 und 7
 Subway to Sally Storybook 1 und 2

References 

1987 births
Living people
Artists from Jena
People from Bezirk Gera
German comics artists
German cartoonists
German women illustrators
German women cartoonists
German female comics artists
20th-century German women artists
Writers from Jena